Side out or Side-out may refer to;

 Side Out, a 1990 American sports film
 Side-Out Foundation, an American non-profit breast cancer charity
 Side-out scoring, a point scoring system used in some racket and net sports

See also
 Inside Out (disambiguation)